Mitko Bachev (born 25 January 1960) is a Bulgarian luger. He competed in the men's doubles event at the 1988 Winter Olympics.

References

External links
 

1960 births
Living people
Bulgarian male lugers
Olympic lugers of Bulgaria
Lugers at the 1988 Winter Olympics
Place of birth missing (living people)